{{safesubst:SUBPAGENAME}} (born August 5, 1945) (Hebrew: אברהם דובדבני) is an Israeli politician and activist who served as the chairman of the World Zionist Organization and is currently the chairman of the Jewish National Fund.

Biography 
Duvdevani was born in Jerusalem on August 5, 1945 to an Orthodox Jewish and Zionist family. He attended Netiv Meir Yeshiva and the Kfar Hasidim Yeshiva. He then enlisted in the Israel Defense Forces as a paratrooper, and participated in the liberation of Jerusalem in the Six-Day War. He proceeded to earn a bachelor's degree in Jewish history and educational administration and a master's degree in sociology of education from the Hebrew University of Jerusalem. In 2010, he was unanimously elected the chairman of the World Zionist Organization. Before this, among other roles, he was the Director General of World Bnei Akiva, was the head of the Informal Education track at Orot Israel College, and was a member of the board of governors and an executive for the Jewish Agency. In 2020, it was announced that he would become the global chairman of the Jewish National Fund. He assumed the role on November 15, 2020. Duvdevani is married with four children and lives in Ramat Gan.

References 

People from Jerusalem
Israeli Jews
1945 births
Living people